Ronald Iain Sutherland, Lord Sutherland (born 1932), is a former Senator of the College of Justice in Scotland, having been appointed in 1985. Known as Lord Sutherland in the Court of Session and High Court of Justiciary, he sat in the First Division of the Inner House of the Court of Session.

His most notable case was as a presiding judge in the Pan Am Flight 103 bombing trial.

He is married to Janice, and they have two sons, Alan and Donald.

Brief Biography
 Graduated from the University of Edinburgh (MA LLB) and was admitted to the Faculty of Advocates in 1956.
 Served as an Advocate Depute from 1962 to 1964 and again from 1971 to 1977.
 Appointed Standing Junior Counsel to the Ministry of Defence from 1964 to 1969.
 Appointed Queen's Counsel (QC) in 1969.
 Member of the Criminal Injuries Compensation Board from 1977 to 1985
 Scottish Representative to the International Association of Judges.

References

Sutherland, Ranald Ian, Lord Sutherland
Members of the Faculty of Advocates
Alumni of the University of Edinburgh
1932 births
Living people
Members of the Privy Council of the United Kingdom